Cyperus unicolor is a species of sedge that can be found in South America.

The species was first formally described by the botanist Johann Otto Boeckeler in 1879.

See also 
 List of Cyperus species

References 

unicolor
Taxa named by Johann Otto Boeckeler
Plants described in 1879
Flora of Argentina
Flora of Bolivia
Flora of Brazil
Flora of Paraguay
Flora of Uruguay
Flora of Venezuela